The 1901 Wisconsin Badgers football team was an American football team that represented the University of Wisconsin in the 1901 Western Conference football season. In its sixth season under head coach Philip King, the team compiled a 9–0 record (2–0 against conference opponents), tied for the Western Conference championship, and outscored opponents by a total of 317 to 5. Arthur Hale Curtis was the team captain.

Caspar Whitney of Outing magazine named two Wisconsin players, tackle Curtis and halfback Al "Norsky" Larson, as second-team players on his 1901 College Football All-America Team. Eddie Cochems and William Juneau also played on the team.

Schedule

References

Wisconsin
Wisconsin Badgers football seasons
Big Ten Conference football champion seasons
College football undefeated seasons
Wisconsin Badgers football